Crispino Agostinucci (October 25, 1797 – 1856) was an Italian Roman Catholic bishop. Born in Urbino, he was appointed as Bishop of  Montefeltro on November 5, 1849, a position he held until his death in 1856. On February 5, 1838, the Basilica di San Marino in San Marino was solemnly inaugurated by Agostinucci and the Captain's-Regent.  He had obtained a doctorate in sacred theology.

References

Bishops of Montefeltro
1797 births
1856 deaths
People from Urbino